Van Wert is a city in and the county seat of Van Wert County, Ohio, United States.  The municipality is located in northwestern Ohio approximately 77 mi (123 km) SW of Toledo and 34 mi (54 km) SE of Fort Wayne, Indiana. The population was 10,846 at the 2010 census. It is the principal city of and is included in the Van Wert Micropolitan Statistical Area, which is included in the Lima-Van Wert-Wapakoneta, Ohio Combined Statistical Area.
Van Wert is named for Isaac Van Wart, one of the captors of Major John André in the American Revolutionary War. A center of peony cultivation, Van Wert has hosted the  annual Van Wert Peony Festival on and off since 1902. Van Wert is home to the first county library in the United States, the Brumback Library. It also has a thriving community art center, the Wassenburg Art Center, and the award-winning Van Wert Civic Theatre. The home office of Central Insurance Companies is located in Van Wert.

History
Van Wert was surveyed in 1824 by Captain James Riley, who was contracted by the government to survey lands purchased from Native Americans under a treaty in 1818. It was incorporated as a town in 1848 and was chartered as a city in 1903.

The town is located in an area originally known as the Black Swamp. Early pioneers had to deal with swampy ground, mud, and malaria.  They persevered, draining the swamp for agriculture and eventually reclaiming enough dry land to establish the town. Van Wert was the birthplace of aviation pioneer Walter Hinton and the famous baritone Charles W. Clark.

At one point, Van Wert was the only place in the world producing Liederkranz cheese.  This pungent dairy product was made at the now-closed Borden plant.

The people of Van Wert (400 of which called themselves "Cheesemakers") contributed to the town of Vimoutiers, Orne, Lower Normandy, France with help in the costs of reconstruction and reparation of the town after it was mistakenly bombed by the US Air Force during World War II. They volunteered to pay for the replacement of Marie Harel's statue in 1953. This is recorded by a plaque in the market square of Vimoutiers. Vimoutiers is a centre for local making of Camembert, Livarot and Pont-l'Évêque cheeses.

On November 10, 2002, an F4 tornado ripped through the town, killing two people. This was one of many tornado touchdowns during the 2002 Veterans Day Weekend tornado outbreak. Van Wert's emergency warning system is credited with saving many lives after several cars were thrown into a movie theatre that had been packed with people just minutes earlier.

Geography
Van Wert is located at  (40.867863, -84.583461).

Demographics

2010 census
As of the census of 2010, there were 10,846 people, 4,536 households, and 2,812 families residing in the city. The racial makeup of the city was 94.6% White, 1.7% African American, 0.1% Native American, 0.4% Asian, 1.2% from other races, and 2.0% from two or more races. Hispanic or Latino of any race were 4.0% of the population.

There were 4,536 households, of which 29.4% had children under the age of 18 living with them, 44.6% were married couples living together, 12.6% had a female householder with no husband present, 4.7% had a male householder with no wife present, and 38.0% were non-families. 33.6% of all households were made up of individuals, and 15.9% had someone living alone who was 65 years of age or older. The average household size was 2.33 and the average family size was 2.93.

The median age in the city was 39.6 years. 24.4% of residents were under the age of 18; 8.2% were between the ages of 18 and 24; 23.1% were from 25 to 44; 26.2% were from 45 to 64; and 18.1% were 65 years of age or older. The gender makeup of the city was 46.8% male and 53.2% female.

2000 census
As of the census of 2000, there were 10,690 people, 4,556 households, and 2,947 families residing in the city. The population density was 1,803.8 people per square mile (696.0/km). There were 4,927 housing units at an average density of 831.4 per square mile (320.8/km). The racial makeup of the city was 96.07% White, 1.50% African American, 0.11% Native American, 0.35% Asian, 1.09% from other races, and 0.89% from two or more races. Hispanic or Latino of any race were 2.25% of the population.

There were 4,556 households, out of which 29.3% had children under the age of 18 living with them, 50.1% were married couples living together, 10.7% had a female householder with no husband present, and 35.3% were non-families. 31.0% of all households were made up of individuals, and 14.0% had someone living alone who was 65 years of age or older. The average household size was 2.31 and the average family size was 2.88.

In the city, the population was spread out, with 24.1% under the age of 18, 9.3% from 18 to 24, 26.7% from 25 to 44, 22.2% from 45 to 64, and 17.7% who were 65 years of age or older. The median age was 38 years. For every 100 females, there were 88.8 males. For every 100 females age 18 and over, there were 86.1 males.

The median income for a household in the city was $33,205, and the median income for a family was $41,711. Males had a median income of $31,441 versus $23,143 for females. The per capita income for the city was $17,413. About 5.0% of families and 7.1% of the population were below the poverty line, including 7.4% of those under age 18 and 7.9% of those age 65 or over.

Education
Van Wert City Schools enrolls 2,027 students in public primary and secondary schools. The district operates 4 public schools including the Early Childhood Center (Pre-school-Kindergarten), Van Wert Elementary School (1st-5th grades), Van Wert Middle School (6th-8th grades), and Van Wert High School (9th-12th grades), along with the Goedde Building as the Central Administrative Offices. Van Wert High School sports participate in the Western Buckeye League, an athletic body sanctioned by the Ohio High School Athletic Association (OHSAA). Van Wert recently built a new high school and middle school complex in 2007, and just opened a new elementary school next to the high school and middle school complex so all students are now in one area. Along with the new high school/middle school complex, a new performing arts center was built, The Niswonger Performing Arts Center of Northwest Ohio, thanks to the private donation of Van Wert High School Alumnus, Scott Niswonger. Every year since 2005, Van Wert Middle School has received the "National Schools to Watch" award.

Van Wert has the main branch of the Brumback Library.

See also
 Albert P. Halfhill, father of the tuna packing industry was one time citizen here running a grocery store.
 The Times Bulletin
 WERT

References

External links
 City of Van Wert
  The story of Marie Harel's 2nd statue offered by the cheesemakers of Van Wert
 Mayor's web site

 
Cities in Ohio
Cities in Van Wert County, Ohio
County seats in Ohio
1848 establishments in Ohio